Entoplocamia is a genus of African plants in the grass family. The  only known species is Entoplocamia aristulata, native to Angola and Namibia.

References

Chloridoideae
Monotypic Poaceae genera
Flora of Southern Africa